Ginger Baker's Air Force was a jazz-rock fusion supergroup led by drummer Ginger Baker.

History
The band formed in late 1969 upon the disbandment of Blind Faith. The original lineup consisted of Ginger Baker on drums, Steve Winwood on organ and vocals, Ric Grech on violin and bass, Jeanette Jacobs on vocals, Denny Laine on guitar and vocals, Phil Seamen on drums, Alan White on drums, Chris Wood on tenor sax and flute, Graham Bond on alto sax, Harold McNair on tenor sax and flute, and Remi Kabaka on percussion. Their first live shows, at Birmingham Town Hall in 1969 and the Royal Albert Hall, in 1970, also included Eleanor Barooshian (both Jacobs and Barooshian were former members of girl group The Cake).

The band released two albums, both in 1970: Ginger Baker's Air Force and Ginger Baker's Air Force 2.  The second album involved substantially different personnel from the first, with Ginger Baker and Graham Bond being the primary constants between albums.

Ginger Baker's Air Force also played a set at Wembley Stadium (original) on 19 April 1970, during the start of the World Cup Rally, which went from London to Mexico City.

In late 2015 Baker announced he would be touring in 2016 with a new version of Ginger Baker's Air Force. The band booked a world tour under the name Ginger Baker's Air Force 3.  Baker's blog said the band would be "showcasing new talent and collaborating with old friends." The band played one show in London on 26 January 2015; the performance was shortened and Baker had to take many breaks due to an injury he had previously sustained. In late February 2016 the entire tour was cancelled due to doctors having diagnosed Baker with "serious heart problems". Baker died in October 2019.

Band members

Members 
Ginger Baker – drums, percussion, vocals 
Denny Laine – guitar, piano, vocals 
Ric Grech – bass, violin 
Harold McNair – saxophone, flute 
Chris Wood – saxophone, flute 
Graham Bond – saxophone, organ, piano, vocals 
Phil Seamen – drums, percussion 
Steve Winwood – organ, bass, vocals 
Jeanette Jacobs – vocals 
Remi Kabaka – percussion, drums 
Alan White – drums, piano 
Colin Gibson – saxophone, bass 
Diane Stewart – vocals 
Eleanor Barooshian – vocals 
 Rocky Dzidzornu – percussion, congas 
 Catherine James – vocals 
Ken Craddock – guitar, organ, piano, vocals 
Steve Gregory – saxophone, flute 
Bud Beadle – saxophone 
Aliki Ashman – vocals 
Neemoi "Speedy" Acquaye – congas, percussion, drums 
Gasper Lawal – congas 
Johnny Haastrup – vocals

Timeline

Discography

Albums
Ginger Baker's Air Force (Recorded Live at The Royal Albert Hall, London, 1970) LP X 2 Polydor – 2662 001 (1970) (UK)
Ginger Baker's Air Force 2 (Recorded at Trident Studios, London, May and October 1970 and at Olympic Studios, London, September 1970) LP X 1 Polydor – 2383 029 (1970) (UK, USA, Italy)(Germany, France, Spain, Australia, New Zealand : different track listing)
Live in Offenbach, Germany 1970 (Recorded Live in the Stadthalle, Offenbach Germany 1970) CD X 2 Voiceprint – VPTMQ055CD (2010) (UK)
Do What You Like (Recorded Live at the Lyceum, London (UK) on 1 February 1971 and live at the City Hall, Sheffield (UK) on 7 December 1970 + studio outtakes, October 1970) CD X 1 ITM Archives ITM 920016 (2015) (UK)

Compilations
Free Kings LP x1 Karussell – 2499 018 (1971) (Germany)
Once Upon A Time LP X 2 RSO – 2658 138 (1972) (Germany)
Pop Giants LP X 1 Brunswick – 2911 522 (1973) (Germany)
Pop History LP X 2 Polydor – 2478 016/2478 017 (1974) (Germany)

Single
Man of Constant Sorrow / Doin' It Polydor – 56380 (1970) (UK)

DVD 
Live 1970 (Filmed in 1970 for German television) DVD x 1, Stereo, NTSC, Gonzo Multimedia – HST035DVD (2010) (UK)

References

External links

Ginger Baker's Official Website

English jazz-rock groups
Musical groups disestablished in 1970
Atco Records artists
Musical groups from London